The Cross Internacional de Itálica is an annual cross country running competition that is held every January in Santiponce, near Seville, Spain. Inaugurated in 1982, the race course is set in the ruins of the ancient Roman city of Itálica. As one of only two Spanish competitions to hold IAAF permit meeting status, it is one of the more prestigious races on the Spanish cross country circuit.

The competition comprises three general categories of race: children's and junior races, the mass participation ("popular") race, and the professional international races. The men's international race was a 10 km race until 1999 when it was increased to roughly 11 km. The distance of the women's international race (currently 8 km) has also fluctuated, varying between 5.5 km and 6.6 km in its early years. The course of the race loops through the ancient streets of Itálica, passing alongside ruins throughout. The red clay ground usually makes for a dry running surface, although rain has occasionally made this a particularly difficult, muddy course in previous editions.

The international fields for the Cross de Itálica frequently feature some of the most successful cross country athletes. Past winners include Paul Tergat, Kenenisa Bekele, Gelete Burka, Paula Radcliffe and Florence Kiplagat. Indeed, in six separate years (1994, 1998, 1999, 2003, 2004 and 2009) one of the winners of the Cross de Itálica has gone on to win at the IAAF World Cross Country Championships.

Past senior race winners

Winners by country

References
General
Italica course profile . Real Federación Española de Atletismo. Retrieved on 2009-11-29.
Civai, Franco & Gasparovic, Juraj (2010-01-18). Cross Italica. Association of Road Racing Statisticians. Retrieved on 2010-01-30.
Specific

External links
Official website 

Cross country running competitions
Athletics competitions in Spain
Sport in Andalusia
Recurring sporting events established in 1982
1982 establishments in Spain
Cross country running in Spain
Annual sporting events in Spain